SS Columbia may refer to:

 , a paddle steamer built by Robert Steele & Company and eventually wrecked
 , an iron steamship built by Archibald Denny, Dumbarton
 , a passenger/cargo vessel built by Alexander Stephen & Sons, Glasgow
 , the first vessel to have electricity
 SS Columbia (1889), a German  Hamburg America Line passenger ship  purchased by Spain for use in the Spanish–American War as the auxiliary cruiser , then returned to commercial service and later purchased by Russia for use in the Russo-Japanese War of 1904–1905 as the auxiliary cruiser Terek
 , a steam trawler built by Mackie & Thomson Govan
 , a British mail ship sold to France and sunk in World War I
 , a Canadian screw-driven tugboat
 , an American excursion steamship
 , a Scottish passenger/cargo vessel originally named HMS Columbella and subsequently named Moreas, scrapped in Venice 1929
 , a passenger/cargo vessel built by New York Shipbuilding, Camden, NJ as Dorothy Alexander, then President then Columbia for Alaska Steamship Co; World War II WSA troop transport serving Alaska 
 , a passenger/cargo vessel built by Russell & Co Port Glasgow
 SS Columbia (1913), originally Katoomba, Australian liner & troop ship in WW I & II, renamed Columbia in 1949 for Greek Lines, scrapped 1959.
 SS Columbia (1914), a British ocean liner renamed Belgic in 1917, then Belgenland again in 1923, before becoming the American ship Columbia in 1935, scrapped 1936
 , a Canadian steam tugboat serving Lower Arrow Lake until 1948
 , a Dutch passenger/cargo ship of the Koninklijke Nederlandse Stoomboot-Maatschappij, sunk by torpedo 1943.

See also

Ship names